John Traill (1835–1897) was the owner of Traill's Temperance Coffee House

John Traill may also refer to:

John S. Traill (born 1939), Canadian scholar
John Traill Cargill (1867–1954), Scottish oil magnate
John Traill Christie (1899–1980), British headmaster
Johnny Traill (1882–1958), Irish–Argentine 10-goal polo player

See also
John Trail (born 1943), Australian sprint canoeist 
John Trailly (died 1400), English soldier and diplomat
Traill (surname)